High mobility group protein HMG14 and HMG17 also known as nucleosomal binding domain is a family of evolutionarily related proteins.

High mobility group (HMG) proteins constitute a family of relatively low molecular weight non-histone components in chromatin. HMG14 and HMG17 are highly-similar proteins of about 100 amino acid residues; the sequence of chicken HMG14 is almost as similar to chicken HMG17 as it is to mammalian HMG14 polypeptides. The proteins bind to the inner side of the nucleosomal DNA, altering the interaction between the DNA and the histone octamer. It is thought that they may be involved in the process that confers specific chromatin conformations to transcribable regions in the genome.

The SMART signature describes a nucleosomal binding domain, which facilitates binding of proteins to nucleosomes in chromatin. The domain is most commonly found in the high mobility group (HMG) proteins, HMG14 and HMG17, however, it is also found in other proteins which bind to nucleosomes, e.g. NBP-45. NBP-45 is a nucleosomal binding protein, first identified in mice, which is related to HMG14 and HMG17. NBP-45 binds specifically to nucleosome core particles, and can function as a transcriptional activator. These findings led to the suggestion that this domain, common to NBP-45, HMG14 and HMG17 is responsible for binding of the proteins to nucleosomes in chromatin.

Examples 

Human proteins containing this domain include:
 HMGN1;     HMGN2;      HMGN3;     HMGN4;    HMGN5;

References

Protein domains